Vince Vance & the Valiants are an American country pop, rock and roll and novelty musical group from New Orleans, Louisiana, United States. The title character Vince Vance is portrayed by Andy Stone, the only permanent member of the group. He was born Andrew John Franichevich Jr. The remainder of the Valiants (or, if female, Valiantettes) are rotating musicians.

The group's most sustained hit record, and one that is uncharacteristic of their usual stylings, is the country ballad "All I Want for Christmas Is You", which charted on the Billboard Hot Country Songs charts on six separate occasions in the 1990s. As a novelty band, their best-known record was their 1980 version of the parody song "Bomb Iran", which narrowly missed the Billboard Hot 100 in 1981.

On November 20, 2010, Vince Vance was surprised during his performance at a "Louisiana Legends" fundraiser at New Orleans Rock'n Bowl venue, with induction into the Louisiana Music Hall of Fame for his outstanding career, including the Christmas song "All I Want for Christmas is You" and his most current "I Am New Orleans".

Discography

Albums

Singles

Music videos

References

External links
 Official Site

Country music groups from Louisiana
American pop music groups
American comedy musicians
Parody musicians
American parodists
Musical groups established in 1971
Musical groups from New Orleans